New Hampshire Route 101 (NH 101) is a state-maintained highway in southern New Hampshire extending from Keene to Hampton Beach. It is the major east–west highway in the southern portion of the state.

The western terminus of NH 101 is in Keene at the junction with New Hampshire Routes 9, 10 and 12. The eastern terminus is in Hampton Beach at the junction with Ocean Boulevard (NH 1A). However, the New Hampshire Department of Transportation has installed mileposts on the freeway section east of Interstate 93 that begin at mile 100. The eastern half of the road, from Bedford to Hampton, is a freeway except for the easternmost two miles, while the western half from Keene to Bedford is a mixture of two- and four-lane roads, town streets and a super two segment that bypasses the town centers of Milford and Amherst.

NH 101 travels through the following municipalities (west to east): Keene, Marlborough, Dublin, Peterborough, Temple, Wilton, Milford, Amherst, Bedford, Manchester, Auburn, Candia, Raymond, Epping, Brentwood, Exeter, Stratham and Hampton. Between Exeter and Hampton, NH 101 is known as the Exeter–Hampton Expressway.

There are two current and three former auxiliary routes for NH 101. The current routes are NH 101A, which connects Milford and Nashua, and NH 101E, which parallels the main route in Hampton.

Route description

Most of the western portion of NH 101 is a two-lane surface road, with a short two-lane freeway section. The eastern half of the route is mostly a four-lane freeway between Manchester and the New Hampshire Seacoast, except for the last few miles to the eastern terminus.

NH 101's western terminus is in Keene at the main intersection anchoring the South Keene retail district. The roadway continues to the west as NH 9, while NH 9, NH 10 and NH 12 turn north from the intersection as a three-way concurrency; NH 101 joins the concurrency heading eastbound at the intersection. At a traffic circle immediately east of this intersection, NH 10 leaves to the south along Winchester Street, while NH 12 leaves south at the next major intersection, Main Street. NH 101 continues straight through both of these intersections as Marlboro Street, and then leaves Keene at the city's southeast corner for the town of Marlborough. Following Main Street through the main village of Marlborough, it meets the western terminus of NH 124 in the center of the village and then proceeds east into the town of Dublin. Also known as Main Street in Dublin, it passes the northern shore of Dublin Pond and the main offices of Yankee Publishing (publishers of Yankee Magazine and the Old Farmer's Almanac) in the central village of Dublin. There is an intersection with NH 137 on the eastern side of Dublin, where NH 101 turns southeast.

Entering the town of Peterborough, the road's name changes to Dublin Road, meeting US 202 in the main village of Peterborough for a short concurrency along Wilton Road. At Granite Street, where US 202 leaves to the north, another short concurrency begins with NH 123, which joins NH 101 on Wilton Road. NH 123 leaves southbound on Elm Hill Road, and NH 101 leaves Peterborough at the town's southeastern corner near Miller State Park and Pack Monadnock Mountain, a popular hiking and birdwatching destination.

NH 101 next enters the town of Temple, home to Temple Mountain, a former ski resort and current state park. Known locally as Gibbons Highway, NH 101 intersects NH 45 in the northern part of the town and next enters Wilton. Joining NH 31 at the northern bank of the Souhegan River, the two routes cross the river to the south bank before NH 31 leaves to the north in the main village of Wilton, while NH 101 continues eastward along the south bank of the Souhegan River along Gibbons Highway into neighboring Milford, where the name changes to Elm Street. West of the main village of Milford, NH 101 turns onto a two-lane freeway bypass of the central business district while Elm Street continues on as NH 101A. There is an interchange with NH 13 and a second interchange with NH 101A as the freeway turns north into Amherst. The route bypasses to the east of the Amherst Village Historic District, which covers the main village of Amherst, and has two interchanges with NH 122; the southernmost of the two is a half-interchange. Past the northern interchange, the road returns to a surface road and turns northeast.

Entering Bedford near the town's southwestern corner, the route crosses the town diagonally to the northeast, and at an intersection with NH 114 turns southeast onto a four-lane divided freeway. From this point to two miles from its eastern terminus, the route is entirely freeway. Shortly after the beginning of the freeway section is a complex series of interchanges with US 3/River Road, Meetinghouse Road, I-293 and the F.E. Everett Turnpike. At this point, I-293 southbound leaves the Everett Turnpike and joins NH 101 eastbound across the Merrimack River into the city of Manchester, with NH 101 taking on I-293's mile markers and exit-numbering sequence.

In Manchester, there are interchanges with NH 3A/Brown Avenue (exit 2) and NH 28/South Willow Street (exit 1), both of which provide access to Manchester–Boston Regional Airport, the state's largest. The latter exit also provides access to the Mall of New Hampshire and the large retail district around it. I-293 ends at a Y-interchange with Interstate 93, while NH 101 joins I-93 north for a short concurrency, along which there is a single interchange (I-93 exit 6: Candia Road/Hanover Street). NH 101 leaves at I-93 exit 7 along another Y-interchange on its own freeway alignment eastward. Along this freeway, the mile markers reset to 100 (which does not match the actual mileage of the route), and the exit numbers begin sequentially at 1. Exit 1 is for New Hampshire Route 28 Bypass/Londonderry Turnpike, which occurs immediately before the NH 101 freeway crosses into Auburn, north of Massabesic Lake.

The freeway turns east into Auburn, where exit 2 provides access to Hooksett Road and NH 121. Next the freeway turns northeast into Candia, where there is a trumpet interchange with NH 43 (exit 3), then southeast and east into Raymond, where exit 4 (Old Manchester Road) provides access to the main village of Raymond and exit 5 provides access to NH 107/Freetown Road with nearby connections to NH 27, NH 156 and NH 102. Continuing east into Epping, exit 6 is for Depot Road/Beede Hill Road and exit 7 for NH 125. Exit 8 is in Brentwood at North Road, which provides access to the New England Dragway and NH 27. In Exeter, exits 9 (NH 27) and 10 (NH 85) each provide access to the main village and central business district, as does exit 11 (NH 108/NH 33/NH 88) and exit 12 (NH 111), both along the Exeter/Stratham town line. Finally entering the seacoast town of Hampton, NH 101 has an unnumbered interchange with I-95 (exit 2 on I-95) and, immediately afterward, exit 13 connects to NH 27 just as NH 101 changes to an undivided two-lane freeway. There is an unnumbered interchange with U.S. 1 (the Hampton Rotary), and the freeway section ends at a traffic light with Landing Road. NH 101 crosses the marshy estuary system of the Hampton River and its tributaries and splits into a pair of one-way streets (Highland Avenue eastbound and Church Street westbound) to its eastern terminus in the Hampton Beach resort community at NH 1A/Ocean Boulevard.

History

Most of the eastern section of NH 101 was originally planned as part of the canceled New England East–West Highway from Albany, New York to Portsmouth. Because of the cancellation, NH 101 remained a two-lane freeway until the mid-1990s. This road was colloquially known as the Highway of Death for its numerous accidents and large signs at the start of the two-lane freeway segment between exits 5 and 6 in Raymond that displayed the number of fatalities that had occurred. In the mid-1990s, the two-lane freeway segment was dualized over much of the swampland that it traversed in Rockingham County, creating a full divided controlled-access freeway between Manchester and I-95.

In 1991, an overpass was constructed over North Road in Brentwood near the Rockingham County Jail Farm for the future routing of NH 101. However, the NH 101 expressway was not built in this area until 2000, giving the bridge the nickname the "bridge to nowhere."

Several portions of the highway have been named after prominent figures by the state legislature. According to the state Department of Transportation, the portion from Keene to the Merrimack River was named the Horace Greeley Highway in 1949. The name Robert C. Erler Highway was given to the stretch of highway "from a beginning point at the Auburn-Candia town line to the Raymond-Epping town line" in 1981. Erler was a former Raymond town selectman and state legislator. In 1995, the name Jay McDuffee Highway was given to the stretch "from the Epping/Raymond town line to its terminus in Hampton."

New Hampshire Route 51

NH 101 between New Hampshire Route 108 in Stratham, just east of the Exeter town line, to New Hampshire Route 1A in Hampton Beach was opened in 1963 as the Exeter-Hampton Expressway. It was marked with round shields featuring the highway's name and was later designated New Hampshire Route 51 from the 1980s until October 1994.

During this time, NH 101 exited the expressway at NH 108 (exit 11) and formed a concurrency with NH 108 north to the community of Stratham. After traversing a traffic circle, NH 101 split from NH 108 and followed the current alignment of New Hampshire Route 33 into downtown Portsmouth, where NH 101 terminated at U.S. Route 1.

On NH 51, there were two traffic lights located on the limited access two-lane highway: the east-end lights at the terminus of New Hampshire Route 88 southeast of exit 11 and the west-end lights west of the Newfields (then-New Hampshire Route 85) exit with what is now New Hampshire Route 27. While NH 88 was rerouted on a new stretch of road to intersect with NH 108 just south of the NH 101/108 SPUI interchange at exit 11, the Newfields exit was upgraded to a full diamond interchange. NH 27 west of Stratham was formerly NH 101 prior to the completion of the four-lane bypass.

In the fall of 1994, the eastern terminus of NH 101 was shifted eight miles (13 km) south from Portsmouth to its current terminus in Hampton Beach, replacing NH 51 along the super two between Exeter and Hampton Beach. Old NH 101 between Stratham and downtown Portsmouth became NH 33, and the NH 51 designation was eliminated.

Future 

New Hampshire 101 has long been proposed as a part of the greater East–West Highway, which would provide upgraded freeway connections across the three northern New England states (Maine, New Hampshire and Vermont). Some early proposals suggested that the route should be part of the Interstate Highway System as Interstate 92, but these were rejected. More recent proposals have suggested that the entire route could be part of a privately maintained toll road.

Northern New England is served by three north–south freeways radiating generally northward from Boston, Massachusetts—from east to west, I-95, Interstate 93 and U.S. Route 3, all flowing from or through the Boston metro area; and westernmost of all, by Interstate 91, which follows the Connecticut River. However, the northernmost complete east–west freeway within the region, Interstate 90 in Massachusetts, does not enter northern New England. Continuous east–west freeway travel through (and within) northern New England is presently accomplished by three segments, only one of which is truly east–west.

There are a handful of alternate east–west roadways, including US-2 between Montpelier, Vermont and Bangor, Maine, US-302 between Montpelier and Portland, US-4 from the New York/Vermont border to Portsmouth, New Hampshire and VT-9 /NH-9 between Bennington, Vermont and the Concord, New Hampshire area. These alternatives are mostly not limited-access roads and are not designed for higher-speed travel.

Major intersections

Suffixed routes

New Hampshire Route 101A

It also runs through Merrimack and Amherst and very briefly touches Hollis.

The western terminus of NH 101A is in western Milford at the intersection with NH 101. The eastern terminus is in the center of Nashua, when it meets New Hampshire Route 111 at the Merrimack River. Most of it is two lanes in each direction, sometimes with a central turning lane.

Route 101A is quite busy by southern New Hampshire standards, with traffic ranging from 26,000 vehicles per weekday in Nashua to 9,000 in western Milford. 

The road carries a number of names. In Milford it is Elm Street and then Nashua Street; in Amherst and Merrimack it is the Milford Road or, more commonly, just 101A; in Nashua it is Amherst Street. There is some confusion over the eastern terminus; Google Maps shows the route continuing to the Taylor Falls Bridge and ending at the bridge, while the official New Hampshire route map shows the route ending at the eastern terminus of Amherst Street, where it meets Main Street and Concord Street. Local signage also stops at the end of Amherst Street.

New Hampshire Route 101B
New Hampshire Route 101B was a designation once held by two separate state highways in New Hampshire. Although the two segments did not directly connect, they were linked at the time by their parent route, New Hampshire Route 101.

Western segment

The western terminus of the route was at U.S. Route 3 and New Hampshire Route 28 in Hooksett, the current western terminus of New Hampshire Route 27. The eastern terminus was at NH 101 near Candia.

All of the western segment of NH 101B was renumbered NH 27 at an unknown time.

Eastern segment

The eastern segment of NH 101B was a short east–west road in downtown Portsmouth. The western terminus was at the intersection of Islington Street and Middle Road, where NH 101, which followed the present alignment of New Hampshire Route 33 into Portsmouth, departed the routing of NH 33 and followed Islington Street to U.S. Route 1. NH 101B continued east on Middle Road and South Street, following the modern alignment of NH 33 to the present eastern terminus of NH 33 at US 1. At US 1, NH 101B continued east on South Street, running along the local street to its eastern terminus at New Hampshire Route 1B.

Prior to 1971, NH 101B from Islington Street east to US 1 became NH 101 while Islington Street and the portion of NH101B east of US 1 reverted to city maintenance. This section of NH 101 was renumbered to NH 33 in 1994.

New Hampshire Route 101C

New Hampshire Route 101C ran from NH 108 east along what is now NH 27 to NH 1A in Hampton Beach.

New Hampshire Route 101D

The portion of NH 111 between New Hampshire Route 27 in Hampton and NH 1A in Hampton Beach was once designated New Hampshire Route 101D.

New Hampshire Route 101E

New Hampshire Route 101E is a short stretch of urban road  in length in Hampton. This road connects Lafayette Road (U.S. Route 1) with Ocean Boulevard (New Hampshire Route 1A). NH 101E is locally named Winnacunnet Road. Despite its name, this highway has never connected with NH 101 or any of its spurs. The entire route is maintained by the town of Hampton.

Guide signs exist at the eastern terminus at NH 1A, but along the road itself, there is no signage to indicate the route's number. It is not known as Route 101E to local residents, who call it Winnacunnet Road.

References

 Steve Anderson's BostonRoads.com: NH 101 Expressway

External links

 New Hampshire State Route 101 on Flickr
 New Hampshire State Route 101A on Flickr
 New Hampshire State Route 101E on Flickr

Freeways in the United States
101
Transportation in Cheshire County, New Hampshire
Transportation in Hillsborough County, New Hampshire
Transportation in Rockingham County, New Hampshire
Two-lane freeways in the United States